Alice Mak may refer to:

Alice Mak (cartoonist), Chinese cartoonist and artist
Alice Mak (politician) (born 1971), member of the Legislative Council of Hong Kong